Eleanor Coleman (March 10, 1905 – October 2, 1978) was an American swimmer.

Early life 
Coleman was born in Chicago and raised in Milwaukee, Wisconsin, the daughter of Charles Lemuel Coleman and Nellie May Emerson Coleman. Both of her parents were born in Illinois; her father was a traveling salesman.

Career 
Coleman competed in the women's 200 metre breaststroke event at the 1924 Summer Olympics. For three years she held a world's record in the women's breaststroke. Later in life, she gave swimming demonstrations, and was a Red Cross examiner for lifesaving.  Beyond the pool, she was a sports writer and editor at the Wisconsin News. She also had a newspaper column and hosted a weekly radio show, both on women's health and fitness. She was appointed promotional chair for the American Red Cross in Brown County in 1939.

Personal life and legacy 
In 1927, she married Marquette University and Green Bay Packers football player, and later Congressman, LaVern Dilweg. The Dilwegs had four children. Her husband died in 1968, and she died in 1978, aged 73 years, in Green Bay, Wisconsin. Her son Gary Dilweg served in the Wisconsin state legislature. Her grandson Anthony Dilweg played football at Duke University, and later with the Green Bay Packers.

References

External links
 

1905 births
1978 deaths
American female swimmers
Olympic swimmers of the United States
Swimmers at the 1924 Summer Olympics
Swimmers from Chicago
20th-century American women